Winners is a studio album by the Brothers Johnson, released in 1981.

Track listing
 "The Real Thing" (George Johnson, Louis Johnson) - 3:48
 "Dancin' Free" (Louis Johnson) - 3:44
 "Sunlight" (George Johnson) - 3:43
 "Teaser" (George Johnson) - 3:45
 "Caught Up" (Louis Johnson, Valerie Johnson) - 4:01
 "In the Way" (David Paich, Jeff Porcaro, Steve Porcaro) - 3:26
 "I Want You" (Louis Johnson) - 5:13
 "Do It for Love" (George Johnson) - 3:40
 "Hot Mama" (George Johnson, Louis Johnson) - 3:23
 "Daydreamer Dream" (Annie Herring) - 4:00

Personnel 
The Brothers Johnson
 George Johnson – lead vocals (1, 3, 4, 8), guitars (1, 2, 4, 5, 6, 8, 9), handclaps (1, 4, 8), string arrangements (1), acoustic guitar (3), backing vocals (3, 8), vocals (6, 7, 9), guitar solo (6, 9), bass guitar (8)
 Louis Johnson – bass guitar (1-7, 9, 10), guitars (1, 7, 9, 10), handclaps (1, 4), keyboards (2, 5, 7), vocals (7, 9), synth bass (9)

Additional musicians
 Greg Phillinganes – keyboards (1, 2, 5, 8)
 Jeff Lorber – keyboards (3), synthesizers (4)
 David Paich – synthesizers (3), synth solo (3), keyboards (4-8), acoustic piano (9)
 Steve Porcaro – keyboards (6), synthesizers (6)
 Annie Herring – acoustic piano (10)
 Steve Lukather – guitars (4, 7, 9), guitar solo (7, 9)
 John Robinson – drums (1)
 Jeff Porcaro – drums (2, 4-10)
 Gerry Brown – drums (3)
 Paulinho da Costa – percussion (1-4, 6, 7, 8), handclaps (1, 4), cowbell (9)
 Debbie Johnson – handclaps (8)
 Ernie Watts – saxophone solo (1)
 Jerry Hey – horn arrangements (1, 3, 4, 8), string arrangements (1, 3, 8)
 David Diggs – horn arrangements (2), string arrangements (2, 5, 7, 10)
 Day Askey Burke – backing vocals (1, 3, 4, 8, 10), handclaps (8)
 Ricky Heath – lead vocals (2), backing vocals (2, 4, 10), vocals (7)
 Lynn Davis – backing vocals (2, 10)
 Valerie Simpson – backing vocals (2, 4), vocals (5, 7), lead vocals (10)
 Yolanda "Yo-Yo" Smith – backing vocals (3)
 Lalomie Washburn – backing vocals (4)

Production 
 The Brothers Johnson – producers, recording, mixing 
 Jack Joseph Puig – recording, mixing
 Jim Cassell – assistant engineer 
 Mark Ettel – assistant engineer 
 Bobby Gerber – assistant engineer
 Don Koldon – assistant engineer 
 Stephen Marcussen – assistant engineer 
 Mike Reese – mastering 
 Doug Sax – mastering 
 The Mastering Lab (Hollywood, California) – mastering location 
 Jeff Ayeroff –  art direction
 Chuck Beeson – art direction, design 
 Norman Seeff – photography 
 Mick McGinty, Willardson & White, Inc. – medallion illustration 
 The Fitzgerald/Hartley Co. – direction

Charts

References

External links
 Brothers Johnson - Winners

1981 albums
The Brothers Johnson albums
A&M Records albums
Albums recorded at Sunset Sound Recorders
Albums recorded at A&M Studios